National Poetry Award may refer to:

 National Poetry Award (Colombia)
 National Poetry Award (Spain)

See also
 Bruce Dawe National Poetry Prize, Australia
 National Book Award for Poetry, United States
 List of poetry awards